75 at 75 is a three-CD compilation album by British singer Cliff Richard, released in 2015. The album contains 75 tracks spanning Richard's career of more than 55 years and was released to coincide with his 75th birthday.

The album includes one new track, "Golden", written by Chris Eaton who also wrote Richard's 1990 UK Christmas number one single, "Saviour's Day".

Track listing

Disc 1
 "Move It"
 "High Class Baby"
 "Mean Streak"
 "Living Doll"
 "Travellin' Light"
 "A Voice In the Wilderness"
 "Fall In Love with You"
 "Please Don't Tease"
 "Nine Times Out of Ten"
 "I Love You"
 "Theme for a Dream"
 "Gee Whiz It's You"
 "A Girl Like You"
 "When the Girl in Your Arms Is the Girl in Your Heart"
 "The Young Ones"
 "I'm Looking Out the Window"
 "Do You Wanna Dance"
 "It'll Be Me"
 "The Next Time"
 "Bachelor Boy"
 "Summer Holiday"
 "Lucky Lips"
 "It's All in the Game"
 "Don't Talk to Him"
 "I'm the Lonely One"
 "Constantly"
 "On the Beach"
 "The Twelfth of Never"
 "I Could Easily Fall in Love with You"
 "The Minute You're Gone"
 "Wind Me Up (Let Me Go)"

Disc 2
 "Visions"
 "Time Drags By"
 "In the Country"
 "It's All Over"
 "The Day I Met Marie"
 "All My Love (Solo Tu)"
 "Congratulations"
 "Big Ship"
 "Throw Down a Line"
 "Goodbye Sam, Hello Samantha"
 "Power to All Our Friends"
 "Miss You Nights"
 "Devil Woman"
 "We Don't Talk Anymore"
 "Carrie"
 "Dreaming"
 "A Little in Love"
 "Wired for Sound"
 "Daddy's Home"
 "The Only Way Out"
 "She Means Nothing to Me"
 "True Love Ways"
 "Please Don't Fall in Love"
 "All I Ask of You" (featuring Sarah Brightman)
 "My Pretty One"

Disc 3
 "Some People"
 "Mistletoe and Wine"
 "The Best of Me"
 "I Just Don't Have the Heart"
 "Silhouettes"
 "From a Distance"
 "Saviour's Day"
 "We Should Be Together"
 "I Still Believe in You"
 "Peace in Our Time"
 "Can't Keep This Feeling In"
 "The Millennium Prayer"
 "Somewhere Over the Rainbow"/"What a Wonderful World"
 "Santa's List"
 "Somethin' Is Goin' On"
 "21st Century Christmas"
 "Move It" [remake] (featuring Brian Bennett and Brian May)
 "Thank You for a Lifetime"
 "Golden"

Charts and certifications

Weekly charts

Year-end charts

Certifications

References

External links
 75 at 75 at AllMusic

Cliff Richard compilation albums
2015 compilation albums
Rhino Records albums
Albums produced by Alan Tarney
Albums produced by Stock Aitken Waterman